Michael Edwards (born Cheshire, 1968) is a British composer.

Edwards studied oboe and composition with Adrian Beaumont at the University of Bristol, followed by further study at Stanford University.  He worked as a software engineer and then as a lecturer at the Universität Mozarteum Salzburg before becoming a lecturer at the University of Edinburgh.

Edwards has composed a wide range of works for both instrumental and electronic media, which have been performed throughout the UK, Europe and North America.

References

External links
Michael Edwards homepage
Michael Edwards publisher
Michael Edwards improvisations

1968 births
21st-century classical composers
Alumni of the University of Bristol
English classical composers
Living people
English male classical composers
21st-century British male musicians